Vladimir Dolgorukov may refer to:

 Vladimir Timofeyevich Dolgorukov, father of Maria Dolgorukova, Czarina, wife of Czar Michel I
 Vladimir Petrovich Dolgorukov (1696–1761), Russian General, Governor of Livonia and Estonia
 Vladimir Andreyevich Dolgorukov (1810–1891), mayor (governor-general) of Moscow 1865–1891

See also
 House of Dolgorukov